Mycotaxon is a peer-reviewed scientific journal that covers the nomenclature and taxonomy of fungi, including lichens. The journal was founded by Grégoire L. Hennebert and Richard P. Korf in 1974. They were frustrated that papers submitted to journals such as Mycologia took a year or longer from submission to publication. Korf and Hennebert introduced a number of innovations to make their journal more efficient and accessible than its contemporaries. Mycotaxon reduced the wait time between submission and publication by requiring authors to submit camera-ready copy. Linotype was the industry standard at the time; Mycotaxon used photo-offset lithography to expedite publication. A quarterly journal, Mycotaxon aimed to publish papers within four months of submission. Mycotaxon took an unusual non-blind approach to refereeing: authors were required to enlist a reviewer outside of their institution to peer-review their manuscript prior to its submission. Initially Mycotaxon did not demand page charges from authors, rather relying on subscription fees to finance publication. Papers of all lengths were accepted.

See also
 Persoonia – a journal with similar scope

References

External links

 

Mycology journals
Publications established in 1974
Multilingual journals
Lichenology
Irregular journals